Havana is an unincorporated community in Boone County, West Virginia, United States.  This community was named circa 1900, one which originated from the Spanish–American War.

References 

Unincorporated communities in Boone County, West Virginia
Unincorporated communities in West Virginia